Usama "Osam" Nyanzi Mukwaya (born 12 December 1989) is a Ugandan screenwriter, film director, producer, actor and former television host. His major films include Bala Bala Sese, directed by Lukyamuzi Bashir with which Mukwaya is credited as the film's writer and producer. The film was nominated at the 12th Africa Movie Academy Awards for Best Film in an African Language.

He launched his filmmaking career with the short film Hello that won overall best film in the 2010 MNFPAC Students Awards. His directorial debut is Love Faces which was released in January 2018. From 2018-2022, Usama served as chief content officer for Stream Afrique, a subscription-based streaming platform which offers online streaming of majorly African content. He is a 2019 recipient of LéO Africa Institute's Young Emerging Leaders Project Fellowship.

Early life and background
Born in Mulago Hospital, Kampala, Uganda, Mukwaya has ancestry from Ganda, Ankole and Rwanda. He is the son of religious leader Abdullah Mukwaya and Aziidah Mariam. As of 24 April 2019, Abdullah serves as the Qadhi of Mbarara District. 
After the death of his mother when he was 8, Mukwaya's aunt took him in; when she died too, Mukwaya had to move in with his father and later on with his grandfather.

He has 4 siblings from his mother and numerous from his father.

Education 
Usama started Pre-Education from Saidat Aisha Nursery School and later to Buraaq Infants School then in Bwaise. After the death of his mother, he was then shifted to Victoria Christian School in Ndeeba and later went on to attend Linnet Primary School in Nabweru, Wakiso District, for his final primary school education. In 2012, Usama joined Shuhada'e Islamic Secondary School for his O-Level and achieved his Advanced Certificate of Education from Nyamitanga Secondary School, both schools in Mbarara.

In 2008, Mukwaya studied Cisco Career Certifications Networking, and LAN/WAN Management under the faculty of information technology at Makerere University. Usama holds a diploma in film directing from MNFPAC. He was reported in 2019 to be pursuing a Diploma in Business Administration at Cavendish University.

Career

Early work (2010–2014) 

According to The Observer newspaper, Usama started his writing as a child. He made his film Industry entry in 2009 through Dan Kiggundu's Maryland Productions where he debuted as a script editor and supporting actor in the TV drama Pain of Lies, which premiered in 2011.

Through Uganda Film Network, he later joined Mariam Ndagire Film and Performing Arts Center, where he worked on his first short film, Hello, which won the overall best film at the 2010 MNFPAC Awards. In July 2011, he made it to the final selection of the 12 screenwriters from all over East Africa to participate in the 7th Maisha Film Lab, ending up with a collaboration with Diana Karua in the making of the movie She Likes Prada.

Later in 2011, Mukwaya won the Young Achievers Award in the film and television category, the youngest among the recipients of the award in the newly introduced category alongside Rwandan president Paul Kagame, who won the lifetime achievement award.

Amidst other four young directors, he directed his first film, Smart Attempt, written by Julian Nabunya and Abel Mwesigwa during the first season of the Movie Furnace programme in August 2012. He went on to participate in the program's second season with his short film In Just Hours; emerging the season's winner for best short film director.

He has worked as a general secretary and treasurer of the Screenwriter's Guild of Uganda Film Network and as general secretary of the Pearl International Film Festival before being appointed festival programmer for the 7th, 8th and 9th editions consecutively.

Usama was on March 25, 2012 quoted by The Observer alongside Ashraf Ssemwogerere in an interview about naming the growing film industry in Uganda, in which he stated that Ugawood could have been the appropriate name, citing that Kinna-Uganda had to do with mediocrity.

In July 2014, Mukwaya started his own film production company O Studios Entertainment, based in Uganda that immediately opened with the production of the short film Tiktok, written and directed by himself. The studio has continued to produce various films including his directory debut, Love Faces.

Film breakthrough

(2015–2018): Bala Bala Sese, Rehema and Love Faces
Immediately after Maisha Film Lab in 2011, Usama met video director Lukyamuzi Bashir of then Badi Films and began working on Bala Bala Sese,
marking his first feature film as producer and writer. The film which also doubles as Lukyamuzi's directory debut was released on 3 July 2015 at theatre Labonita. It became one of the first Ugandan projects to receive a professional marketing structure and continued to top the best Ugandan films of 2015 and the following year. It was nominated at the 12th Africa Movie Academy Awards for Best Film in an African Language. Bala Bala Sese also went on to feature in various international film festivals, including the Luxor African Film Festival in Egypt, where it held its African premiere and competed in the Long Narrative category with 13 other African films. It was the opening film at the 10th Amakula International Film Festival, automatically qualifying for the Golden Impala Award in the best African film category, which was won by De Noir. The film debuted its European release at the Helsinki African Film Festival in Finland. It features former celebrity couple Natasha Sinayobye and Michael Kasaija as on-screen lovers, first time film actor and former The Ebonies member Raymond Rushabiro with veteran stage actor Ashraf Ssemwogerere as the narrator and actor in the film.

After the release of Bala Bala Sese, Usama teamed up with Allan Manzi as writer and producer to make the coming-of-age provocative short film Rehema. The film made its debut screening at the 38th Durban International Film Festival and also won best short film at the 2017 Uganda Film Festival

In 2018, after the first collaboration with Bobby Tamale on the silent short film Tiktok, Mukwaya and Bobby released Love Faces, Usama's feature directory debut where he teamed up again with actors Laura Kahunde (Hello) and Patriq Nkakalukanyi (Tiktok), alongside first timer Moses Kiboneka Jr. The film was a co-production between Tamz Production and Usama's O Studios Entertainment. Love Faces won best picture at Viewers Choice Movie Awards and was nominated at the 2017 Uganda Film Festival for Best Costume Design and Production Design, 2018 Amakula International Film Festival for best feature film among other nominations.

2021 – present: The Blind Date
The Blind Date marked the second collaboration between Usama and Loukman Ali after working together on Kyaddala TV Series which was released in 2019.
The Blind Date is the first of the three episodes meant to make an anthology of sorts. The short film features Martha Kay alongside Michael Wawuyo Jr. with Raymond Rushabiro who stars as former army man – Jacob alongside Riverdan Rugaaju, Patriq Nkakalukanyi and Allen Musumba. A follow up episode titled Sixteen Rounds premiered on September 16, 2021. The 37 minutes short features Michael Wawuyo Jr. again and Natasha Sinayobye in leading roles. It won best short film at the 43 Durban International Film Festival, Best short film at the 7th Mashariki African Film Festival and received a special mention at the 11 Luxor African Film Festival. Loukman announced in October that a feature film based on the Sixteen Round's story is in the making and Usama will be producing it.

Television 
In July 2013, Mukwaya had his television hosting debut on the second season of the Movie Digest Show on Record TV Network Uganda, with actress Monica Birwinyo replacing pioneer host and former Tusker Project Fame 3 contestant Jacob Nsaali. Mid 2018, Usama joined the production of Reach a Hand Uganda's television drama Kyaddala as a producer, his debut television drama series with Humphrey Nabimanya as Executive Producer and Emmanuel Ikubese as the show's creator. The series, set in a present day high school life focuses on real life social issues that affect young people in Africa and stars actors from Nigeria, Kenya and Uganda. It was announced in October 2020 that the series would be renewed for the second season with Usama returning as producer and in talks to direct as well. Kyaddala Season two premiered again on NBS TV March 4, 2022 with Usama producing and directing the entire season.

In July 2020, Usama joined the production of the first season of MultiChoice Uganda' original TV series, Sanyu. The series premiered on DStv Uganda's  Pearl Magic Prime on 8 February 2021, at the official launch of the channel.

On October 18, 2022, Usama was named as producer of inaugural edition of The iKON Awards: Film and Television slated for March 25, 2023. This marks his first "live" television production credit for a major show. The awards are meant recognize and reward personalities in the Ugandan Film and Television industry.

Philanthropy 
Mukwaya began his philanthropy work in January 2015 with Empowerment of Disadvantaged Youth and Children (EDYAC) when he traveled to Tororo in Eastern Uganda to share life experiences. He and Bobby Tamale later made a documentary available on YouTube about the experience with the video, directed and narrated by Mukwaya.

Usama Mukwaya Scholarship 
The Usama Mukwaya Scholarship is an annual merit-based scholarship offered by Usama to support outstanding, collaborative, rising Ugandan creatives in an innovative one-year film and theatre experience. It is administered by Marisul, a non profit organization founded by Usama  himself. The inaugural scholarship was awarded in May 2021 to Kizito Ismael after winning best theatre production at the Mariam Ndagire Film and Performing Arts Center, Class of 2021.

Personal life
Mukwaya currently lives in Kampala.

Awards and nominations

Usama has received numerous awards and nominations including a nomination at the 12th Africa Movie Academy Awards for Best Film in an African Language film for his film Bala Bala Sese. His 2021 short film Sixteen Rounds won best short film at the 43 Durban International Film Festival and 7th Mashariki African Film Festival.

Filmography

Film

Television

Acting credits

Documentary

Commercials

Frequent collaborators

References

External links

 
 

Usama Mukwaya
1989 births
Living people
English-language film directors
Ugandan film directors
People from Kampala
Maisha Film Lab alumni
MNFPAC alumni
Ugandan television personalities
Ugandan screenwriters
Ugandan film producers
Silent film producers
21st-century Ugandan male actors
Makerere University alumni
People from Kampala District
Ugandan Muslims
Ganda people
Silent film directors